Jack Thomas is an American academic administrator who served as the 11th President of Western Illinois University. He was named to the position January 18, 2011, and took office July 1, succeeding Alvin Goldfarb.

Education 
Thomas earned a B.A. in English from Alabama A&M University in 1983, a M.Ed. in English Education from Virginia State University in 1984, and a Ph.D. in English Literature and Criticism from Indiana University of Pennsylvania in 1990.

Career 
Prior to his appointment as president of Western Illinois University, Thomas held the post of provost and academic vice president at WIU, beginning in 2008. Before joining WIU, he held the positions of senior vice provost for academic affairs and interim dean at Middle Tennessee State University, as well as academic posts at University of Maryland Eastern Shore and South Carolina State University.

On June 14, 2019, he announced that he would be resigning from his position as president, effective June 30. Upon Thomas's resignation, incoming provost Martin Abraham succeeded him as the university's acting president while the Board of Trustees conducted a national search for a new president.

In November 2022, it was announced that Central State University had hired outside counsel to investigate allegations made by five women Thomas created a “toxic work culture” that has included discrimination, slander, demotions and fear of retaliation.

Personal life 
Thomas and his wife, Linda, have two sons, Patrick and Darius.

References

Living people
Date of birth missing (living people)
Heads of universities and colleges in the United States
American educational theorists
Indiana University of Pennsylvania alumni
Virginia State University alumni
Alabama A&M University alumni
Western Illinois University people
Middle Tennessee State University faculty
University of Maryland Eastern Shore faculty
South Carolina State University faculty
Year of birth missing (living people)